The 189th Secondary School or officially Comprehensive Secondary School No.189 with deep learning of English and German from the first grade of Desna raion of Kyiv municipality   is an ordinary public school which provides compulsory and specialized education.

History 

The school was opened in 1967. It was the first secondary school in the Lisovyi masyv – microdistrict of the Desnianskyi District of Kyiv.
During this time, the school established certain traditions that teaching staff and keep multiplying, namely:
 training and education of students - these are two inseparable processes;
 transfer of knowledge through the formation of interest in the subject development and curiosity of students.
In 1987 the institution received the status of 'Schools with advanced studies of English and German from first grade.
There are 1084 students now enrolled in 40 classes. In these advanced courses of English and German in 24 classes. The school is equipped with 12 foreign language classrooms, 2 computer classes.
School pupils are actively involved in the district, city competitions and sections of the Small Academy of Science of Ukraine. They are often taken prizes and awarded diplomas.

Teachers 
 Antonenko Inna Semenivna
 Atamanchuk Irina Mihailivna
 Bura Galina Terentiivna
 Gudsenko Valentina Ivanivna
 Ignatov Olexandr Volodimirovich
 Kabaluk Irina Igorivna
 Klimenchuk Nadiya Grigirivna
 Kravchuk Valentina Volodimirivna
 Matvienko Mykola Mykolayovich
 Ostrova Zinaida Romanivna
 Pergamenshik Mihail Semenovich
 Sagan Trohim Trohimovich
 Shum Regina Yosipivna
 Shvaykivska Tamara Petrivna
 Trusova Ludmila Olexandrivna

See also 
Kyiv Natural Science Lyceum No. 145

Kyiv Specialized School No. 159

Ukrainian Physics and Mathematics Lyceum

References

Schools in Kyiv
Educational institutions established in 1967
1967 establishments in the Soviet Union
Secondary schools in Ukraine
Schools in the Soviet Union